Bogdan Ionuț Țîru (born 15 March 1994) is a Romanian professional footballer who plays as a centre-back for Liga I club CFR Cluj.

International career
In November 2016 Țîru received his first call-up to the senior Romania squad for matches against Poland and Russia. He made a debut on 15 November 2016 against Russia.

Career statistics

Club

International

Honours
Viitorul Constanța
Liga I: 2016–17
Cupa României: 2018–19
Supercupa României: 2019

References

External links

1994 births
Living people
Romanian footballers
Association football defenders
Liga I players
Liga II players
Liga III players
Ekstraklasa players
FC Viitorul Constanța players
FC Voluntari players
Jagiellonia Białystok players
CFR Cluj players
Romania youth international footballers
Romania under-21 international footballers
Expatriate footballers in Poland
Romania international footballers
Sportspeople from Constanța